Christmas in Bethlehem is a 2009 Christmas album by Carola Häggkvist.

Track listing
Heaven in my Arms (Himlen i min famn)
Hark, the Herald Angels Sing (with Aygun Beyler and Mahsa Vahdat)
Silent Night ("Stille Nacht, helige nacht") (with Hans-Erik Husby)
Find My Way to Betlehem
Poor, Little Jesus (with Gladys del Pilar)
O Holy Night ("Cantique de Noël") (with Paul Potts)
From Heaven High
Good Christian Men, Rejoice
The Little Drummer Boy (with Blues)
O Sanctissima
Heaven Turned out to be a Child (with Linda Lampenius & Julian Erlandsson)
O Little Town of Bethlehem
Go Tell It on the Mountain
This Very Night the World will Change (I denna natt blir världen ny)
O Come All Ye Faithful (Adeste Fideles)

Charts

Weekly charts

Year-end charts

References

2009 Christmas albums
Carola Häggkvist albums
Christmas albums by Swedish artists